Acid Mothers Gong Live Tokyo is a live album by Acid Mothers Gong, a band featuring members of Gong and Acid Mothers Temple (members of which had previously been in Gong itself), recorded during April 2004 at the Doors Club in Tokyo, but not released until 2006 by Voiceprint, catalogue number VP382CD. No producer was credited, but mixing was carried out by guitarist Kawabata Makoto and drummer Yoshida Tatsuya and editing was by Daevid Allen.

Track listing 
 "Gnome" – 0:40
 "Ooom Ba Wah!" – 1:54
 "Crazy Invisible She" – 3:45
 "The Unkilling Of Octave Docteur DA 4J" – 9:15
 "Avahoot Klaxon Diamond Language Ritual" – 4:52
 "Rituel: Umbrage Demon Stirfry & Its Upcum" – 3:19
 "Jesu Ali Om Cruci-Fiction" – 1:36
 "Ze Teapot Zat Exploded" – 8:19 ("Flying Teapot" alternate title)
 "Eating Colonel Saunders Upside Down" – 6:24
 "Vital Info That Should Never Be Spoken" – 2:04
 "Parallel Tales Of Fred Circumspex" – 5:37
 "The Isle Of Underwear" – 12:35
 "Ohm Riff Voltage 245" – 7:44
 "Totalatonal Farewell To The Innocents" – 6:20

Personnel 
Daevid Allen – guitar gliss, vocals/fx
Gilli Smyth  – space whisperer
Josh Pollack – guitar, megaphone
Kawabata Makoto – guitar, voices
Cotton Casino – synth, voices
Hiroshi Higashi – synth, voices
Yoshida Tatsuya – drums, sampler
Tsuyama Atsushi – bass, whistle, vocals

References

Gong (band) live albums
2006 live albums